Bilene Macia District is a district of Gaza Province in south-western Mozambique. Its principal town is Macia. The district is located at the south of the province, and borders with Chókwè District in the north, Xai-Xai District in the east, and Magude District of Maputo Province in the west. In the south, the district is bounded by the Indian Ocean. It has a population of 151911 as of 2007.

Geography
The rivers in the district belong to the drainage basins of the Komati River and the Munhuane River, a major left tributary of the Komati. There are three permanent lakes in the district Lake Chuali, Lake Pave, and Lake Sacative.

The climate is tropical semi-arid in the interior and tropical humid at the coast.

Demographics
As of 2005, 43% of the population of the district was younger than 15 years. 58% of the population spoke Portuguese. The most common mothertongue among the population was Tsonga. 60% were analphabetic, mostly women.

Administrative divisions
The district is divided into six postos, Chissano (five localities), Macuane (three localities),  Mazivila (three localities), Messano (two localities), Praia do Bilene (one locality), and Vila da Macia (one locality).

Economy
3% of the households in the district have access to electricity. The district has a tourist potential, due to relative proximity to Maputo. Out of 165 existing lodges, 102 are in operation.

Agriculture
In the district, there are 30,000 farms with, on average  of land. The main agricultural products are corn, cassava, cowpea, peanut, and sweet potato.

Transportation

References

 
Districts in Gaza Province